In graph theory, a branch of mathematics, the Erdős–Hajnal conjecture states that families of graphs defined by forbidden induced subgraphs have either large cliques or large independent sets. It is named for Paul Erdős and András Hajnal.

More precisely, for an arbitrary undirected graph , let  be the family of graphs that do not have  as an induced subgraph. Then, according to the conjecture, there exists a constant  such that the -vertex graphs in  have either a clique or an independent set of size .

An equivalent statement to the original conjecture is that, for every graph , the -free graphs all contain polynomially large perfect induced subgraphs.

Graphs without large cliques or independent sets
Ramsey's theorem proves that no graph has both its maximum clique size and maximum independent set size smaller than logarithmic. Ramsey's theorem also implies the special case of the Erdős–Hajnal conjecture when  itself is a clique or independent set.

Partial results
This conjecture is due to Paul Erdős and András Hajnal, who proved it to be true when  is a cograph. They also showed, for arbitrary , that the size of the largest clique or independent set grows superlogarithmically. More precisely, for every  there is a constant  such that the -vertex -free graphs have cliques or independent sets containing at least  vertices. The graphs  for which the conjecture is true also include those with four verticies or less, all five-vertex graphs except the five-vertex path and its complement, and any graph that can be obtained from these and the cographs by modular decomposition.
As of 2021, however, the full conjecture has not been proven, and remains an open problem.

An earlier formulation of the conjecture, also by Erdős and Hajnal, concerns the special case when  is a 5-vertex cycle graph. This case has been resolved by Maria Chudnovsky, Alex Scott,  Paul Seymour, and Sophie Spirkl in 2021. The -free graphs include the perfect graphs, which necessarily have either a clique or independent set of size proportional to the square root of their number of vertices. Conversely, every clique or independent set is itself perfect. For this reason, a convenient and symmetric reformulation of the Erdős–Hajnal conjecture is that for every graph , the -free graphs necessarily contain an induced perfect subgraph of polynomial size.

Relation to the chromatic number of tournaments  
Alon et al.  showed that the following statement concerning tournaments is equivalent to the Erdős-Hajnal conjecture.

Conjecture. For every tournament , there exists  and  such that for every -free tournament  with  vertices .

A coloring of a tournament  is a mapping  such that the color classes  are transitive for all .

The class of tournaments  with the property that every -free tournament  has  for some constant  satisfies this equivalent Erdős-Hajnal conjecture (with ). Such tournaments , called heroes, were considered by Berger et al. There it is proven that a hero has a special structure which is as follows:

Theorem. A tournament is a hero if and only if all its strong components are heroes.

Here  denotes the tournament with the three components , the transitive tournament of size  and a single node . The arcs between the three components are defined as follows: . The tournament  is defined analogously.

References

External links
The Erdös-Hajnal Conjecture, The Open Problem Garden

Ramsey theory
Conjectures
Unsolved problems in graph theory
Hajnal conjecture